The Covered Bridge (originally called Red Bridge) in Cedarburg, Ozaukee County, Wisconsin, United States, is one of the last remaining covered bridges in that state, which once had about 40 covered bridges. It was listed on the National Register of Historic Places in 1973 and is now used only for pedestrian traffic.

History
 
The bridge was built in 1876, the result of a petition by area farmers. It was constructed to serve as a permanent replacement for previous bridges that had washed out on various occasions. In 1927, an abutment was added under the center of the bridge to support heavier vehicle traffic, such as cars and trucks, which were not present at the time of the original construction.

The Ozaukee County Board took over the bridge's preservation and maintenance in 1940.

In 1960, Ozaukee County bought the bridge and surrounding land for $7,500 and developed the area into Covered Bridge County Park.

After nearly a century of continuous use, the bridge began to suffer, with the heavy traffic loosening the planks. It was decided that the only way to preserve the bridge was to alleviate the burden. It was also restricted to pedestrian traffic. A second, modern bridge was built beside it to the west, only a few yards away. This new bridge is now used for vehicular traffic on the adjacent Covered Bridge Road. The original bridge was listed on the National Register of Historic Places on March 14, 1973.

In 2009, the county planned to spend over $19,000 on capital improvements for the Covered Bridge County Park, with part of the money to be used for new decking and railings for the bridge.

Construction and specifications

The Covered Bridge is situated in a north–south orientation over Cedarburg Creek.

The bridge was built using oak and pine timbers, wood that was prepared at a site near Baraboo, Wisconsin. The lattices are very large, made of oak, and were assembled without the use of bolts or nails. The boards used at the sides and ends measure , and have joints covered by  battens. There are diagonal braces that measure , and are tenoned to fit into cross tie beams, and fitted with  oak wedges.

The cross tie beams at the floor are notched and bolted at each end.

The interior walls were lined with a protective wheel guard about one foot above the deck.

The abutments are made of fieldstone set in white mortar. The center abutment was originally also made of fieldstone, but sometime before 1937 was replaced with concrete.

Plaques and historical markers

The bridge displays a plaque, placed on it in 1955 by the Port Washington Chapter of the Daughters of the American Revolution, that identifies it as the "last covered bridge in Wisconsin" and lists the dates of 1876 and 1955. In 1965 a historical marker was erected in front of the bridge by the Ozaukee County Historical Society which identifies it as "Last Covered Bridge" and states that it was built in 1876 and "retired" in 1962.

Replica
A replica of the Covered Bridge, named the Springwater Volunteer Bridge, was built in 1997 in Waushara County, Wisconsin.

See also
List of bridges documented by the Historic American Engineering Record in Wisconsin
List of bridges on the National Register of Historic Places in Wisconsin
National Register of Historic Places listings in Ozaukee County, Wisconsin

References

External links

Image of Springwater Volunteer Bridge, the replica bridge

Road bridges on the National Register of Historic Places in Wisconsin
Bridges completed in 1876
Wooden bridges in Wisconsin
Tourist attractions in Ozaukee County, Wisconsin
Pedestrian bridges in the United States
1876 establishments in Wisconsin
Historic American Buildings Survey in Wisconsin
Historic American Engineering Record in Wisconsin
National Register of Historic Places in Ozaukee County, Wisconsin
Covered bridges on the National Register of Historic Places in Wisconsin
Former road bridges in the United States
Lattice truss bridges in the United States